Lake Vrana, in the centre of Cres island, is a fresh water lake,  wide and about  long. The town of Cres has been supplied with drinking water from the lake since 1953, and the towns of Mali and Veli Lošinj received their supplies ten years later. It was thought at one time that the water in the lake was linked to some mainland source by underground streams, but it has since been established that in fact it originates from the atmosphere.

Description
The lake is one of cryptodepression characteristics. It was formed by very heavy tectonic movements along a longitudinal relaxation fault which now contains  of fresh water.

The lake contains pike, tench and carp. There are also eels, but their origin is still unclear.

Myth of Lake Vrana
There is a local legend that there is a castle under the lake. According to the legend, a rich sister who lived in the castle would not give her much poorer sister money or food.  As a result, she was punished by having her castle flooded during a severe thunderstorm which caused Lake Vrana to be created. The story goes on to tell that on some windy days, if one is to listen very carefully the tower bells can still be heard ringing to this day.

See also

References

Further reading

External links

Vrana
Landforms of Primorje-Gorski Kotar County
Cres